Futebol Clube M'patu a Ponta is an Angolan sports club from the village of Ambriz, in Bengo province.
The team currently plays in the Gira Angola.

In 2015, the club withdrew from the Gira Angola, citing financial reasons.

Achievements
Angolan League: 0

Angolan Cup: 0

Angolan SuperCup: 0

Gira Angola: 0

League & Cup Positions

Players

See also
Girabola

References

External links
 
 

Football clubs in Angola
Sports clubs in Angola